Patersonia babianoides is a species of plant in the iris family Iridaceae and is endemic to the south-west of Western Australia. It is a tufted, rhizome-forming herb with soft, linear to elliptic leaves and blue-violet tepals on a relatively short flowering scape.

Description
Flowering mainly occurs from September to November.

Taxonomy and naming
Patersonia babianoides was first described in 1873 by George Bentham in Flora Australiensis, from specimens collected by James Drummond in the Swan River Colony. The specific epithet (babianoides) means "Babiana-like".

Distribution and habitat
This patersonia is common in the Darling Range, mostly between the Helena Valley and Collie where it grows in jarrah forest in the Jarrah Forest and Warren biogeographic regions of south-western Western Australia.

Conservation status
Patersonia babianoides is listed as "not threatened" by the Government of Western Australia Department of Biodiversity, Conservation and Attractions.

References

babianoides
Flora of Western Australia
Plants described in 1873
Taxa named by George Bentham